Atlantic Express (a trading name of Skyblue Airways) is an airline based at Exeter International Airport in the United Kingdom. It started operations in 2008 following the collapse in 2007 of the original airline which flew the route from Jersey Airport to London Stansted Airport.
Services terminated on 15 January 2007. But services from Stansted to Jersey are going to restart in May 2009. The flights will be daily and operated with ATR 72 aircraft with airline, Aurigny.

Skyblue Airways Limited trading as Atlantic Express holds a United Kingdom Civil Aviation Authority Type A Operating Licence (suspended at Atlantic's request until 5 May 2009), it is permitted to carry passengers, cargo and mail on aircraft with 20 or more seats.

History 
Atlantic Express was a trading name for Atlantic Air Transport Limited part of the Air Atlantique Group. Its main base was at Coventry Airport and it operated a scheduled service between Jersey and London Stansted Airport using ATR42 aircraft. 

The airline operated flights from Jersey to London Stansted between  27 May 2006 and 15 January 2007. 

In January 2008 arrangement were made with Skyblue Aviation, an ATR pilot training company based at Exeter International Airport, to operate one ATR42 under the Atlantic Express banner. The one aircraft has a 46-seat interior and is used for charter work.

Fleet 
As of December 2008 the Atlantic Express fleet includes:

2  ATR 42-300

Former fleet

As of 2006, the Atlantic Express fleet included:

3 ATR 42-300
2 ATR 42-200
1 Metro

See also
 List of defunct airlines of the United Kingdom

References

External links
Atlantic Express

Defunct airlines of the United Kingdom
Airlines established in 1985
British companies established in 1985